TREXCO, INC. is a professional services company specializing in assisting food and confectionery companies in selling their products in Latin America and the Caribbean. TREXCO was formed in 1998 in Miami, Florida, by Jaime Sigal, a native of Mexico.

Name
The name of the firm, TREXCO, is an acronym.
 
 TR stands for Trade.
 EX stands for Export.
 CO stands for Consulting.

History
In 1998, Jaime Sigal, a native of Mexico formed TREXCO in Miami, Florida. Today, as a full-service Export Management Company (EMC), TREXCO is active in 21 countries of Latin America and the Caribbean.

Memberships
TREXCO is a member of FITA, The Federation of International Trade Associations.

Services 
Advertising, policy, ideology and general business rules, product acceptability/suitability, competitive operation, export barriers, and consumer prospects.

References

Management consulting firms of the United States
Companies based in Broward County, Florida
Plantation, Florida